David Hill (born 20 June 1946) is an English-born Australian business leader and author.

Background and early career
Born out of wedlock in Eastbourne in 1946, into an impoverished family of four boys, Hill and his twin brother spent time in Barnardo's children's home in Barkingside. 

Hill's early years of schooling were at Bourne Junior Primary School. He migrated to Australia together with his elder brother and twin brother in April 1959, aboard the SS Strathaird. His mother arrived in Australia a few years later. Prior to departing England, Hill and his brothers had enrolled to attend Fairbridge Farm School in Molong in the Central West region of New South Wales.

Hill has since written a book about the experiences of the child migrants. The documentary The Long Journey Home was aired on ABC TV on 17 November 2009, detailing some of the history associated with Fairbridge Farm School and other orphanages of that time. He also became a passionate and effective advocate for British and Australian government recognition that child migrants had been poorly treated.

Prior to his rise to prominence in business circles, Hill was variously a hardware shop assistant, a sandwich cutter, a labourer on building sites, a refuse collector and gardener; he sold tennis coaching courses, worked as a barman, waiter, pub bouncer, delivery agent, tutor at the University of Sydney, journalist, investment bank worker, an accountant, and was in charge of the NSW Government Ministerial Advisory Unit.

Career
Having in 1978 been appointed an Associate Commissioner of the Public Transport Commission in 1982, at 36 years of age, Hill was appointed as the chief executive of the State Rail Authority, serving until 1987. He remained as a director of the State Rail Authority until 1997. Hill served as chairman and managing director of the Australian Broadcasting Corporation from 1987 to 1995, head of Soccer Australia, chairman of Sydney Water, director of the Australian National Airlines Commission and Chairman of CREATE, a national organisation responsible for representing the interests of young people and children in institutional care. A former North Sydney rugby league junior, Hill was president of the North Sydney Bears Rugby League Football Club between 1989 and 1992. He was instrumental in the eventual ban on cigarette sponsorship of the game.

Hill is strongly in favour of the return of the Elgin Marbles to Greece. As well as being a member of the British Marbles Reunited campaign, he is the founder and current chairman of the International Association for the Reunification of the Parthenon Sculptures.

He was an unsuccessful political candidate representing Labor for the Division of Hughes at the 1998 federal election.

Hill has written a number of non-fiction books on Australian history, including histories of the First Fleet and early colonial New South Wales.

Personal life
Hill married Stergitsa Zamagias in 1998, and together they have a son. They live in Sydney.

Selected published works

References 

Chairpersons of the Australian Broadcasting Corporation
1946 births
Living people
Australian chief executives
Managing directors of the Australian Broadcasting Corporation
Australian human rights activists
Australian historians
English emigrants to Australia
Australian people of Scottish descent
Australian maritime historians
Sydney Water
Elgin Marbles